Tyler Randall Young (born July 15, 1990) is an American professional stock car racing driver and team owner. He owns Young's Motorsports, a team in the NASCAR Camping World Truck Series which fields the Nos. 02, 12 and 20 Chevrolet Silverados. He also has been a driver for his own team, last starting a race in 2018. Before stepping back to driving part-time to focus on the ownership side of the team, Young drove his No. 02 full-time in 2014 and 2015.

Racing career

Early career

When he was 12, Young started racing in the International Karting Federation, winning a championship in 2004. Afterwards, he ran races in Hobby Stocks, Sport Modifieds and Modifieds, moving to Mooresville, North Carolina in 2008 to continue his career. That year, he began competing in the Hooters Pro Cup Series, finishing 27th in his debut at South Boston Speedway.

Camping World Truck Series

In 2012, Young and family-owned Young's Motorsports made their debuts in the Camping World Truck Series at Rockingham Speedway with the No. 02 Chevrolet Silverado. After starting 26th, he finished 28th. He made three more starts in the season, with a best finish of 20th at Bristol Motor Speedway. The following year, he made seven starts, with a best finish of 19th at Texas Motor Speedway.

In 2014, Young ran the full Truck schedule for Young's. He recorded a best finish of 11th at Chicagoland Speedway. The following year, he recorded his first career top ten at Dover International Speedway, followed by another tenth-place finish at Talladega Superspeedway.

In 2015, Young collected two top tens and finished 13th in the standings.

In 2016, Young ran 14 races and finished 19th in the standings.

Xfinity Series
On July 10, 2015, Young made his Xfinity Series debut at Kentucky Speedway, driving the No. 90 Chevrolet Camaro for SS-Green Light Racing. Qualifying was rained out, forcing him to start 31st, and he battled a loose car to finish 28th.

Motorsports career results

NASCAR
(key) (Bold – Pole position awarded by qualifying time. Italics – Pole position earned by points standings or practice time. * – Most laps led.)

Xfinity Series

 Ineligible for series points

Camping World Truck Series

References

External links
 
 

Living people
1990 births
People from Midland, Texas
Racing drivers from Texas
NASCAR drivers
CARS Tour drivers